The 2014–15 Senior Women's Cricket Inter Zonal Two Day Game was the inaugural season of India's Inter Zonal women's first-class competition. Five teams representing regions (or "zones") of India competed in a round-robin league, playing four two-day matches. All matches were held at grounds in Kolkata. Central Zone won the tournament, winning three matches on first innings. The tournament replaced the Inter Zone Women's One Day Competition.

Competition format
The five teams played in a round-robin league, therefore playing four matches. Matches were played using a two-day format.

The league worked on a points system with positions within the league being based on the total points. Points were awarded as follows:

Win: 6 points. 
Tie: 3 points. 
Loss: 0 points.
Drawn (lead after first innings): 3 points 
Drawn (trail after first innings): 1 point 
Drawn (no decision on first innings): 1 point 
Abandoned without a ball bowled: 1 point

If points in the final table are equal, teams are separated by most wins and then by their quotient (runs per wicket for divided by runs per wicket against).

Standings

Source: CricketArchive

Fixtures

Round 1

Round 2

Round 3

Round 4

Round 5

References

2014-15
2014–15 Indian women's cricket
Domestic cricket competitions in 2014–15